Fritzi Metznerová (born 16 December 1910, date of death unknown) was a Czech figure skater. She competed in the ladies' singles event at the 1936 Winter Olympics.

References

1910 births
Year of death missing
Czech female single skaters
Olympic figure skaters of Czechoslovakia
Figure skaters at the 1936 Winter Olympics
Place of birth missing